George Howell (9 June 1822 – 18 November 1890) was an Australian cricketer. He played four first-class matches for New South Wales between 1855/56 and 1858/59.

See also
 List of New South Wales representative cricketers

References

External links
 

1822 births
1890 deaths
Australian cricketers
New South Wales cricketers
Cricketers from Sydney